Oliver Richard Shoaff (November 10, 1923 – October 5, 2001) was an American professional basketball player. He played in the National Basketball League for the Detroit Vagabond Kings and the Hammond Calumet Buccaneers during the 1948–49 season and averaged 8.4 points per game.

References 

1923 births
2001 deaths
American men's basketball players
United States Army personnel of World War II
Basketball players from Illinois
Detroit Vagabond Kings players
Guards (basketball)
Hammond Calumet Buccaneers players
High school baseball coaches in the United States
High school basketball coaches in the United States
Illinois Fighting Illini men's basketball players
People from Mount Carmel, Illinois
Southern Illinois Salukis men's basketball players